The Bishari dwarf gecko (Tropiocolotes bisharicus) is a species of gecko of the genus Tropiocolotes. It is found in Egypt. The specific epithet bisharicus refers to the Bisharin tribe, which lives in the same region as this species.

References

bisharicus
Reptiles described in 2001
Reptiles of North Africa
Endemic fauna of Egypt